Pizzaiolo is an American-style pizza chain in Canada. The chain has 43 restaurants in the Greater Toronto Area.

History
Pizzaiolo was founded in Montorio nei Frentani, Molise, Italy in the early 1940s by Nonno Giuseppe and Nonna Ida, and was run at a small pizzeria. The company name derives from the Italian word pizzaiolo  which means "pizza maker". In the 1960s, the company moved to Toronto where the chain was started by "Mama Anna" and "Papa Antonio". They opened their first full-fledged restaurant in 1967.

Pizzaiolo currently has 43 locations in the Greater Toronto Area.

References

External links

Pizzaiolo - The Pizza Maker's Pizza
Pizza chains of Canada